Karel Vachek (4 August 1940, Tišnov – 21 December 2020, Prague) was a Czech documentary film director and film pedagogue at FAMU.

Filmography
 Moravian Hellas (1964)
 Elective Affinities (1968)
 New Hyperion or Liberty, Equality, Brotherhood (1992)
 What Is to Be Done? A Journey from Prague to Ceský Krumlov, or How I Formed a New Government (1996)
 Bohemia Docta or the Labyrinth of the World and the Lust-house of the Heart. A Divine Comedy (2000)
 Who Will Watch the Watchman? Dalibor, or the Key to Uncle Tom's Cabin (2002)
 Záviš, the Prince of Pornofolk Under the Influence of Griffith's Intolerance and Tati's Monsieur Hulot's Holiday or the Establition and Doom of Czechoslovakia 1918-1992 (2006)
 Obscurantist and His Lineage or The Pyramids' Tearful Valleys (2011)
 Komunismus a síť aneb Konec zastupitelské demokracie (2020)

References

External links

 

1940 births
2020 deaths
Czech film directors
People from Tišnov